Allen High School can refer to:

 Allen High School (Nebraska), Allen, Nebraska
 Allen High School (Oklahoma), Allen, Oklahoma
 Allen High School (Texas), Allen, Texas
 Elsie Allen High School, Santa Rosa, California 
 Glen Allen High School, Henrico, Virginia
 William Allen High School, Allentown, Pennsylvania
 The Allen School, Asheville, North Carolina